Shelton Lea (1946–2005) was an Australian poet active in the Melbourne performance poetry scene.

Biography

Lea was born in 1946 in Fitzroy and was soon after given up by his biological mother. He was adopted at the age of 13 months, along with another brother and sister, into the famous Darrell Lea family in Toorak. At the hands of his adoptive mother, Lea suffered and ran away from home at the age of 12.
After a series of criminal charges in his youth (including being homeless which was a crime under the Vagrancy act)  led to stints in boys homes, and finally entered juvenile detention at Turana  where he first started to write poetry.  His first poem began with a rhyming couplet that was not his own - (forewarned by legends of my youth/i trust not an associate's truth..) and then he completed the poem with his own words  which later appeared in Poems from a Peach Melba Hat.  He regularly performed this first poem, because like much of his work, it was autobiographical. While in Turana he also discovered the writing of Ezra Pound which he claimed determined the course of his life. Lea entered Pentridge Prison at 17, which he described as the nihilism of Kafka and the horror of Dante.  He was released two months into a three-month sentence but he never really recovered. He was also incarcerated in Long Bay and the Goulburn Prison for minor offences.  He did not return to prison after he turned 21.
After his release, he went on to publish many collections of his work, as well as establishing Eaglemont Press and publishing the poetry of others. He also opened a number of bookshops, specialising in rare books.
He was closely associated with the "Heide" Collective and mentored over thirty years by his close friend, the poet and librarian, Barrett Reid.

His final collection of poetry was Nebuchadnezzar, published by "Black Pepper Publishing" shortly before his death in 2005.

Lea's poetry has been widely anthologised.

Death

On 13 May 2005, Lea died of lung cancer only days after the launch of his final collection.

At the time of his death a documentary on his poetry was being filmed by Robert Price and Taylor Coventry and is available to view on Vimeo.

Legacy

A biography of Lea, Delinquent Angel, was written by Diana Georgeff and published by Random House in 2007.

The Nebuchadnezzar Poems are also available on a limited edition cd.

Bibliography

 "The Asmodeus Poems" (1962)
 "Corners In Cans" (Still Earth Press, 1969)
 "Chrysalis", Limited Edition, Illustrated by Joel Elenberg (National Press, 1972)
 "The Paradise Poems" (Seahorse Publications, 1973)
 "Chockablock With Dawn" (UQP Makar Press Gargoyle Poets 13, 1975)
 "Palatine Madonna" (Outback Press, 1979)
 "Poems From A Peach Melba Hat" (Abalone Press, 1985)
 "The Love Poems" (Eaglemont Books, 1993)
 "Totems" (Eaglemont Books, 2003)
 "Nebuchadnezzar" (Black Pepper Publishing, 2005).

References

 Obituary, by Gig Ryan, The Age, 1 June 2005

External links
 "Sketches of Shelton" on ABC Radio National Poetica
  review of biography 'Delinquent Angel', by Gig Ryan, The Age, 11 August 2007

Review of biography of Shelton Lea 'Delinquent Angel', 'Torment of an Angel' by Rod Moran, The West Australian, July 14, 2007.
Review of biography of Shelton Lea,'Delinquent Angel', 'Damaged Bard of Bohemia' by John Tranter, Weekend Australian, July 14–15, 2007.
Interview with Diana Georgeff, author of 'Delinquent Angel', 'Bohemian Tragedy' by Angela Bennie, Sydney Morning Herald, July 14–15, 2007.
Review of biography of Shelton Lea,'Delinquent Angel', Article by Kay Hall, Insights, Vol 20 No 2, ARCS (Adoption Research and Counselling Service) November 2007.
Review of 'Delinquent Angel', 'Poet's Life Not so Sweet' by Kathleen Noonan, Courier Mail, July 28, 2007.
Review of 'Delinquent Angel', 'The Beat of a Rebel Drum' by Alan Wearne, The Sydney Morning Herald, July 28–29, 2007. 
Review of 'Delinquent Angel' 'Ode to the Boy' by Kathy Hunt, The Bulletin, July 17, 2007.
Review of 'Delinquent Angel', 'Remembering Shelton Lea' by David Prater, Overland, 11/5/2008.

1946 births
2005 deaths
20th-century Australian poets
Australian male poets
20th-century Australian male writers
Writers from Melbourne
People from Fitzroy, Victoria